The 1992 English cricket season was the 93rd in which the County Championship had been an official competition. Essex won a second successive Britannic Assurance title. Durham entered the Championship for the first time. This was the first time that a new county had been admitted to the championship for 71 years since Glamorgan in 1921. 
Pakistan defeated England 2–1 in the Test series.

Honours
County Championship - Essex
NatWest Trophy - Northamptonshire
Sunday League - Middlesex
Benson & Hedges Cup - Hampshire
Minor Counties Championship - Staffordshire
MCCA Knockout Trophy - Devon
Second XI Championship - Surrey II 
Wisden - Nigel Briers, Martyn Moxon, Ian Salisbury, Alec Stewart, Wasim Akram

Test series

Pakistan tour

County Championship

NatWest Trophy

Benson & Hedges Cup

Sunday League

Leading batsmen

Leading bowlers

References

External links
 CricketArchive – season and tournament itineraries

Annual reviews
 Playfair Cricket Annual 1993
 Wisden Cricketers' Almanack 1993

English cricket seasons in the 20th century
English Cricket Season, 1992
Cricket season